Jimmy Evans Oghenerukwe (born 13 March 1999) is a Nigerian professional footballer who plays as a forward for Uruguayan Primera División club Danubio.

Career
Evans joined Rocha in 2019 after accompanying his friend from Nigeria for trials with the club. He won Uruguayan Segunda División Amateur title in his first season with the club.

Evans moved to Danubio in January 2022. He made his professional debut for the club on 8 February 2022 by scoring his team's only goal in a 1–0 league win against Cerrito.

Career statistics

Honours
Rocha
 Uruguayan Segunda División Amateur: 2019

References

External links
 

1999 births
Living people
Sportspeople from Lagos
Association football forwards
Nigerian footballers
Uruguayan Primera División players
Uruguayan Segunda División players
Rocha F.C. players
Danubio F.C. players
Nigerian expatriate footballers
Nigerian expatriate sportspeople in Uruguay
Expatriate footballers in Uruguay
21st-century Nigerian people